Mathias Feldges (10 August 1937 – 17 September 2022) was a Swiss politician. A member of the Social Democratic Party of Switzerland, he served on the Executive Council of Basel-Stadt from 1984 to 1997.

Feldges died on 17 September 2022, at the age of 85.

References

1937 births
2022 deaths
20th-century Swiss politicians
Social Democratic Party of Switzerland politicians
University of Basel alumni
People from Oberaargau District